Sarah was launched at Hartlepool in 1800. Between 1807 and 1813 Sarah made two voyages as a whaler. On her first whaling voyage her captain claimed the Auckland Islands for Britain. As she was coming home a French privateer captured her, but a British privateer recaptured her. After her whaling voyages Sarah became a transport, a West Indiaman, and traded with North America. She was last listed in 1826.

Career 
Susan entered Lloyd's Register in 1801 with G. Robson, master and owner. The next year her master changed from Robson to Lghtley, and her trade from London–Jamaica to London–St. Domingo.

J. Lightly sold Sarah to Samuel Enderby & Sons c. 1807. The information did not get into the Register of Shipping until 1809, and later into Lloyd's Register. The registers were only as accurate as shipowners chose to keep them, and in this case they carried stale data for some time. The 1809 register showed Sarah with A. Bristow, master, Enderby, owner, and trade London–South Seas. 

Sarah, Abraham Bristow, master, sailed from England on 24 March 1807, bound for New Zealand. Bristow had discovered the Auckland Islands in 1806 as master on the whaler . When he visited again in October 1807 on Sarah he claimed the archipelago for Britain. During 1808 Sarah gathered a full cargo fur and seal pelts.

Sarah was returning to Britain from the South Seas. The British letter of marque , Bateman, master, recaptured Sarah on 10 November and sent her to Cadiz or Lisbon. On 22 November Sarah had arrived at Cadiz after her recapture.

On 15 December Sarah was in the Downs when a gale developed. She lost her anchors and was blown into Margate Roads.

Sarah returned on 20 April 1810.

Enderby sold Sarah to Mather & Co., who sent her on a second whaling voyage. Captain William Davey sailed from England on 24 July 1810. Sarah returned on 9 January 1813.

Lloyd's Register for 1814 showed Sarah with Weatherly, master, Mather & Co., owners, and trade London transport. She had undergone repairs in 1813.

Notes

Citations

References
 
 

1800s ships
Age of Sail merchant ships of England
Captured ships
Whaling ships